The 2020–21 Canisius Golden Griffins men's ice hockey season was the 41st season of play for the program, the 23rd at the Division I level, and the 18th season in the Atlantic Hockey conference. The Golden Griffins represented Canisius College and were coached by Trevor Large, in his 4th season.

The start of the college hockey season was delayed due to the ongoing coronavirus pandemic. As a result, Canisius's first scheduled game was in late-November as opposed to early-October, which was the norm.

Season
As a result of the ongoing COVID-19 pandemic the entire college ice hockey season was delayed. Because the NCAA had previously announced that all winter sports athletes would retain whatever eligibility they possessed through at least the following year, none of Canisius' players would lose a season of play. However, the NCAA also approved a change in its transfer regulations that would allow players to transfer and play immediately rather than having to sit out a season, as the rules previously required.

Even after being delayed, Canisius had the start of their season disrupted by cancellations and postponements. The Golden Griffins played two games over a 62-day period. In February the team was finally able to put a string of games together and showed themselves to be one of the better teams in the western pod of Atlantic Hockey teams. After a four-game winning streak, Canisius was nearing their first top-20 ranking in years but the team was swept by a down Air Force club. Due to Canisius having so few games on their schedule, the losses to Air Force meant that the team had little chance of making the NCAA Tournament without winning their conference tournament.

After the Golden Griffins dispatched RIT in the quarterfinals, they had to get past a very strong Army team to reach the championship. The two teams battled through a close game, needing overtime to decide the winner, and J. D. Pogue's marker sent the Griffs to the title game. Canisius was unable to overcome American International despite the Yellow Jackets facing their own COVID problems and had to settle for second place. Canisius had a slim chance of being selected as an at-large bid but when the tournament teams were released, Atlantic Hockey was essentially disregarded, with league-leading AIC being given the 16th and final space in the bracket.

The program has a great deal to be proud of from this season. The runner-up finish was the second best performance the team had ever achieved and, despite playing less than half as many games as the year before, Canisius won more games. With sophomore Jacob Barczewski establishing himself as the team's starting goaltender, the Golden Griffins are well-placed for next season.

John Stampohar and MacGregor Sinclair sat out the season.

Departures

Recruiting

Roster

As of September 17, 2020.

Standings

Schedule and Results

|-
!colspan=12 style=";" | Regular Season

|-
!colspan=12 style=";" | 

|- align="center" bgcolor="#e0e0e0"
|colspan=12|Canisius Won Series 2–0

Scoring statistics

Goaltending statistics

Rankings

USCHO did not release a poll in week 20.

Awards and honors

References

Canisius Golden Griffins men's ice hockey seasons
Canisius Golden Griffins
Canisius Golden Griffins
Canisius Golden Griffins
2021 in sports in New York (state)
2020 in sports in New York (state)